The fifth-generation iPad Pro, colloquially known as the M1 iPad Pro, is a line of iPad tablet computers developed and marketed by Apple Inc. Announced on April 20, 2021, it was available with the same screen size options as its predecessor:  and . Preorders began on April 30, 2021, and the product was released worldwide on May 21, 2021. It comes in two colors: Silver and Space Gray.

Significant upgrades over the previous generation include the new Apple M1 processor, the addition of 5G support in cellular models, support for Thunderbolt 3 and USB4, and for the 12.9-inch model, a new mini LED Liquid Retina XDR display.

History 
The tech community was divided on whether Apple would use the M1 chip or a hypothetical A14X chip for its fifth generation iPad Pro. After Apple announced that it would use the M1, speculation surfaced that it might run macOS. The iPad's general availability was temporarily constrained by an ongoing chip shortage of 2020 and 2021.

General 
In spite of minor differences in weight and thickness due to hardware upgrades, the tablet is virtually identical to its predecessor. Weight of the 12.9-inch model has increased from 641 grams to 682 grams, while that of the 11-inch model has decreased from 471 grams to 466 grams. It is compatible with the second generation Apple Pencil and the Magic Keyboard; Apple designed a revised variant of Magic Keyboard for the 12.9-inch model due to its change in thickness.

The iPad Pro uses 100% recycled aluminum and sources at least 98% recycled rare earth element supplies. It is free of any harmful substances, as defined by Apple's proprietary "Apple Regulated Substances Specification".

Features

Hardware  
The fifth generation iPad Pro uses an Apple M1 SoC, which is the first iPad not based on a customary A-series processor. The M1 features an eight-core CPU in a hybrid configuration with four high-performance and four high-efficiency cores, an eight-core GPU, and a 16-core Neural Engine. The cellular model supports mmWave 5G and allows speed up to 4 Gbit/s in ideal conditions. Internal storage options include 128 GB, 256 GB, 512 GB, 1 TB and 2 TB. The 128, 256, and 512 GB versions includes 8 GB of RAM, while the 1 and 2 TB versions are bundled with 16 GB of RAM.

The fifth generation iPad Pro debuted support of Thunderbolt 3 and USB4 with its USB-C port. The latter can transfer data at up to 40 gigabits per second and can be used to connect external displays, such as the Pro Display XDR. The 11-inch model has a Liquid Retina display with a peak brightness at 600 nits, which is the same as the 11-inch model of the 3rd and 4th generations. The 12.9-inch model, in contrasts, boasts mini LED HDR display called the Liquid Retina XDR display built in with a 1,000,000:1 contrast ratio, full screen brightness of 1,000 nits and a peak brightness of 1,600 nits (HDR). Both models support True Tone, ProMotion, 120 Hz variable refresh rate, and P3 wide color gamut.

It supports a dual camera system in the back. In addition to a 12 MP wide camera with an aperture of ƒ/1.8, and another 10 MP ultra-wide camera with a ƒ/2.4 aperture and a 125º field of view. A brighter True Tone flash is also included. It features an ultra-wide 12 MP 122º-field front-facing camera that enables Apple's "Center Stage" technology, which pinpoints the positions of the users and automatically tracks the camera view accordingly to perspectivally centers them. The Wide Cameras can record videos at up to 4K and 60 frames per second. All cameras have Smart HDR 3, the same HDR technology present in the iPhone 12 series. It includes the same sensors as their predecessors: Face ID, Lidar, three-axis gyroscope, accelerometer, barometer, and an ambient light sensor.

Accessories 
In addition to the second generation Apple Pencil, the Smart Keyboard Folio, and the Magic Keyboard, the fifth-generation iPad Pro supports third-party external accessories such as game controllers (Sony's PlayStation and Microsoft's Xbox controllers).

Apple's fifth-generation iPad Pro can also be used with many other peripherals that transform it into a versatile computer. As such a wide range of USB-C accessories like USB-C hubs and USB-C docks.

Reception
The fifth generation iPad Pro received mixed responses from critics. Some reviewers said that its overboosted processor was limited by iPadOS and the lack of professional macOS applications, while other criticized the placement of its camera system. The Verge criticized the lack of multiuser support like the Mac but praised the Mini-LED and cameras.

See also 
 Pen computing
 Graphics tablet
Apple M1

References

External links 

Official Tech specs website

Pro
iPad Pro
Tablet computers
Touchscreen portable media players
Tablet computers introduced in 2021
Foxconn